Rodger Fitzwater (born January 15, 1962) is an American politician who served in the Missouri House of Representatives from the 36th district from 1995 to 2001.

References

1962 births
Living people
Democratic Party members of the Missouri House of Representatives